Mark Lewis Baldwin is a computer game designer, most noted for his work on The Perfect General and Empire Deluxe. He has three games on Computer Gaming World's list of the best games of all time.

He has formerly been involved with the management of several games companies, including Quantum Quality Productions, Moto1 where he was vice-president and White Wolf Productions where he was CEO.

Mark is currently a Professor of Practice at Colorado School of Mines.   His career has been quite varied including Captain in the US Air Force, lead engineer for ascent flight design for the Space Shuttle, award-winning game designer, entrepreneur, consultant, and academic.

Early life and education

Mark was born to William and Bette Baldwin in Lansing, Michigan on January 29, 1952.   His father was an officer in the USAF, and therefore he grew up as a military dependent traveling throughout the globe.  In the US, he lived in Indiana, Michigan, Alabama, Georgia and Florida.   He also grew up in Japan (3 yrs) and Germany (3 yrs).

In 1970, Mark attended Purdue University in West Lafayette, Indiana obtaining both a BS and MS in Engineering Sciences, graduating in December 1974.

Career
While at Purdue, Mark received an Air Force ROTC scholarship.   Upon completion of his degree, he was commissioned in the Air Force. Initially, he was a combat engineer (Red Horse) but quickly changed over to Missile Flight Officer at SAC headquarters in Omaha Nebraska where he planned and modeled both US and Soviet nuclear war plans.

Upon leaving the Air Force in 1979, Mark was employed by McDonnell Douglas Aerospace as a contractor for NASA at Johnson Space Center.  Initially, he was responsible for developing abort techniques for the first four flights of the Space Shuttle.  He then was promoted to Lead Engineer for ascent flight design for the Space Shuttle, where he was responsible for all flight designs between STS-5 and STS-51L.   He left NASA two days before the Challenger Disaster (1986) to do similar work for Martin Marietta in Denver Colorado.

One of Mark's early interest and hobbies going back to the 1960s was strategy games.   He published a science fiction paper game (Lensman) in his teens that was well received.  With the advent of personal computers, Mark started developing computer games in his evenings while working at NASA.  After moving to Denver Colorado, he decided that Martin Marietta was not a company he wanted to work for, so he left Aerospace in 1987 to work full-time on computer games.

Mark has authored or was involved with many games, including Starbase 13, Empire, Star Fleet I, Star Fleet II, D.R.A.G.O.N.  FORCE, and Star Legions.  In 1991, Mark cofounded White Wolf Productions, one of the top computer game design houses in the country.  White Wolf's products include the award-winning The Perfect General, Empire Deluxe and most recently Empire II: The Art of War.  One innovative work he is quite proud of was the Empire Deluxe Scenarios for which Mark managed to create the first Computer Game Anthology incorporating the work of such notable designers and authors as Jerry Pournelle, James Dunnigan, Don Gilman, Will Wright, Trevor Sorensen and many others.

White Wolf closed its doors in December 1995, to allow the principals to move on to different projects.  Mark was active with the game industry and the military.  During this period, projects included Galaxis and Metal Fatigue in the computer game industry; and Sensor Combat and JWARS for the military.  He was Vice President of Production for Quantum Quality Productions and Vice President of Game Development for Moto1, Inc.

Mark was also instrumental in establishing early industry organizations.    As early as 1988, Mark was an advocate for the forming of the Computer Game Developers Association (CGDA).   In addition, he was a founding board member of the International Game Developer's Network (IGDN) which later merged with the CGDA to form the current International Game Developers Association (IGDA).

In 2004, Mark was invited to develop a games program at Media Design School in Auckland New Zealand where he spent 6 months teaching.   Upon return to the US, he started teaching as an adjunct and visiting professor at a number of schools including University of Advanced Technology, DeVry University, Westwood College (where he was program chair) and Southern New Hampshire University.  This led to a teaching position at the prestigious Colorado School of Mines.

Games and commercial software
Trainz Railroad Simulator 2006, Auran, 2005
BalanceLog, HealtheTech, 2003
SCCA Racing, Moto1, 2002
NHRA Drag Racing Main Event, Moto1, 2001
NHRA 50th Anniversary Drag Racing, Moto1, 2001
Ted IIC, Gametech, 2001
Diamond Pro and Elite, Gametech, 2000
Metal Fatigue, Psygnosis, 2000
Sensor Combat – The Balkan Cauldron, Air Force Information Warfare Center, 1997
Galaxis, Trimark, 1996
Empire II: The Art of War, New World Computing, 1995
Empire Deluxe: Masters Edition, New World Computing, 1994
The Perfect General II, American Laser Games, 1994
Empire Deluxe: Scenario Disk, New World Computing, 1993
Empire Deluxe, New World Computing, 1993
Star Legions, Mindcraft, 1992
Greatest Battles of the 20th Century, Quantum Quality Productions, 1992
The Perfect General: Battles of  World War II, Quantum Quality Productions, 1991
The Perfect General, Quantum Quality Productions, 1991
D.R.A.G.O.N. Force, Interstel, 1989
Star Fleet II: Krellan Commander, Interstel, 1988
Empire: Wargame of the Century, Interstel, 1988
Star Fleet I: The War Begins, Interstel, 1986
CPRESS Reservoir Information System, Exper-Tech, 1983
Starbase 13, SoftSide, 1982

References

External links
 http://baldwinconsulting.org
 

Year of birth missing (living people)
Living people
American video game designers
Purdue University College of Engineering alumni
Colorado School of Mines faculty
Southern New Hampshire University faculty
Satellite High School alumni